A choli (Hindi: चोली, Urdu: چولی, Nepali: चोलो cholo) (known in South India as ravike (Kannada: ರವಿಕೆ, Telugu: రవికె, Tamil: ரவிக்கை)) is a blouse or a bodice-like upper garment that is commonly cut short leaving the midriff bare, it is worn along with a sari in the Indian subcontinent. The choli is also part of the ghagra choli costume in the Indian subcontinent.

In Northern Gujarat bordering Rajasthan, Palanpur in particular (Banaskantha), it is referred to as polku .

Evolution

The choli evolved from the ancient stanapatta, also known as kurpsika or kanchuki, which was one of the forms of three-piece attire worn by women during the ancient period. This consisted of the antriya lower garment; the uttariya veil worn over shoulder or head; and the stanapatta, a chestband, which is mentioned in Sanskrit literature and Buddhist Pali literature during the 6th century BC. 

Paintings from Maharashtra and Gujarat from the first millennium BCE are considered the first recorded examples of the choli. Poetic references from works such as Silapadikkaram indicate that during the Sangam period (third-century BCE to fourth-century CE in ancient South India), a single piece of clothing served as both lower garment and upper shawl. Paintings and sculpture indicate that the stanapatta evolved into the choli by the first century CE, in various regional styles. Rajatarangini, a tenth-century literary work by Kalhana, states that the choli from the Deccan was introduced under the royal order in Kashmir.

Early cholis were front-covering and tied at the back. Cholis of this kind are still common in state of Rajasthan. In Nepal, the garment is known as a cholo, and in Southern India as a ravike. Both of these styles are tied at the front, unlike Northern Indian cholis, which are tied at the back. In parts of the Hindi Belt, mostly in Rajasthan, Haryana and Uttar Pradesh, women wore vest-like garments, known as kanchli, over choli; this complete costume is known as the poshak.

Historical paintings

Historic photographs

Changing times

Traditionally, the choli has been made from the same fabric as the sari, with many sari producers adding extra length to their products so that women can cut off the excess fabric at the end of the sari and use it to sew a matching choli. For everyday wear, cotton-based materials and silk cotton are widely considered the most comfortable. Chiffon and silk are best suited for formal occasions. The ideal fabric for cholis in the summer is chiffon and georgette. 

Designers have experimented with the choli, influencing pop-culture fashion in the Indian subcontinent, with adventurous tailoring and innovative necklines, such as halter, tubes, backless or stringed. Anupama Raj, a designer and boutique owner, commented that "there is a very real need to re-invent the choli so that it can be worn with a variety of outfits. Just as we see the choli to be a deconstructed form of the blouse, we need to deconstruct the choli." Bobby Malik, an exporter-turned-designer commented "the choli is the most sensuous of all garments created for women. It not only flatters the feminine form, but also brings out the romanticism in a woman. But where Indian designers have failed is at giving it an international look and making it still more beautiful."

Recent styles

See also
 Blouse
 Bralette
 Sari
 Gagra choli

References

External links

Indian clothing
Pakistani clothing
Embroidery
Needlework
Saris
Tops (clothing)
Kerala clothing
Embroidery in India
Sri Lankan clothing